Ahmet Orel (born 5 January 1969) is a Turkish wrestler. He competed in the men's freestyle 52 kg at the 1992 Summer Olympics.

References

External links
 

1969 births
Living people
Turkish male sport wrestlers
Olympic wrestlers of Turkey
Wrestlers at the 1992 Summer Olympics
Sportspeople from Samsun